Frédérik Cabana (born May 16, 1986) is a professional ice hockey left winger who currently plays for Rote Teufel Bad Nauheim of the DEL2.

Playing career
Frederik Cabana began his playing career by playing for the Halifax Mooseheads of the Quebec Major Junior Hockey League. After two successful years with the team, Cabana was drafted by the Philadelphia Flyers in the 2004 NHL Entry Draft in the 6th round, 171 overall.

On May 30, 2006, the Philadelphia Flyers announced that they had signed him to a three-year entry-level contract. "I am really happy," said Cabana. "It is a dream come true, first getting drafted by the Flyers and now getting signed by the team. It is great. I am more of an all-around player. I am good defensively and I can agitate players on the ice and do anything to help my team win."

Following Flyers training camp, he was sent down to the Philadelphia Phantoms, the AHL affiliate of the Flyers, where he played his first season of professional ice hockey.

In 2009, Cabana moved to the German 2nd Bundesliga with Heilbronner Falken. After one season, he moved within the league to rivals Ravensburg Towerstars. In three seasons with Ravensburg, Cabana was amongst the team's offensive leaders. In his final season, Cabana led the club with 22 goals and 53 points in only 43 games.

On July 29, 2013, he was signed to a two-year contract with top tier DEL club, the Hamburg Freezers.

Frederik has a brother, Michael, who plays for the Sherbrooke Saint-francois of the LNAH.

Career statistics

Regular season and playoffs

International

References

External links

1986 births
Living people
Canadian ice hockey left wingers
Halifax Mooseheads players
Ice hockey people from Quebec
Sportspeople from Sherbrooke
Mississippi Sea Wolves players
Philadelphia Flyers draft picks
Philadelphia Phantoms players
Dornbirn Bulldogs players
Hamburg Freezers players
Heilbronner Falken players
Canadian expatriate ice hockey players in the United States
Rote Teufel Bad Nauheim players
Canadian expatriate ice hockey players in Austria
Canadian expatriate ice hockey players in Germany
Naturalized citizens of Germany